Alex Soria (1965–2004) was a rock and roll musician and songwriter from Montreal. He was the founding member of the power pop/punk rock groups The Nils (1978–2004) and Chino (1999).

Career
Soria formed The Nils when he was only 13. He would listen to punk rock records such as The Clash, Sex Pistols and Stiff Little Fingers. He bought himself an $80 guitar and taught himself three chords. By 1978 The Nils had formed and began playing live.

In 1982, The Nils released "Scratches and Needles" for the BYO compilation Something to Believe In, and "Call of the Wild" for the Primitive Air Raid compilation. The band began to tour extensively and still managed to deliver a power pop/punk rock EP entitled Paisley in 1984.

By 1985, The Nils had befriended Ivan Doroschuk of Men Without Hats who loaned the band $3,500 to record the Sell Out Young EP. The album's success drew the attention of a few major labels and by the following year, The Nils accepted an offer from a subsidiary of Profile Records to record the self-titled LP The Nils (produced by Chris Spedding and award-winning engineer Phil Burnett). This album included updated versions of the songs "Daylight" and "Inbetweens" from Sell Out Young, as well as eight other original songs.

With this the band continued to get critical acclaim and set off on a second North American tour before it was being abruptly cancelled due to the label's bankruptcy. Bound by their five-year contract with the now defunct label and unable to release anything under The Nils name until the contract's expiration, the band broke up and went their separate ways. Alex's brother Carlos robbed the band of its remaining money and ran away to Los Angeles, leaving Alex to begin a day job in Montreal.

In 1994 Mag Wheel Records released Green Fields in Daylight, a compilation of all their recordings. Later, Soria formed the band Chino in an effort to break away from The Nils and start anew. The band released the six-song EP Mala Leche in 1999 and continued to play shows but never got as much public attention as The Nils. In 2002, The Nils reformed with Carlos now on bass, and ex Flounger and Chino guitar player and close friend of Alex, Mark Donato. The band began writing new songs and Soria finally seemed hopeful that this could be their second chance.

On December 13, 2004, in a moment of desperation, Alex Soria ended his life on a train track near his home in Montreal. He was 39 years old. Months later, musicians including Chris Spedding and John Kastner (Doughboys, Asexuals) held a sold out tribute concert in his name.

In 2006 Paul, the owner of a Montreal record shop, released the album Next Of Kin, featuring unreleased acoustic four-track recordings by Alex.

References

External links
 Jamie O'Meara, "Alex Soria remembered", in Hour Community, December 23, 2004.
 Mark Boudreau, "Alex Soria of The Nils R.I.P.", The Rock'n'Roll Report, December 16, 2004.

1965 births
2004 deaths
Musicians from Montreal
Canadian punk rock musicians
20th-century Canadian male musicians